Martin Tomek (born 12 September 1969) is a retired Czech goalkeeper.

References

1969 births
Living people
Czech footballers
AFK Atlantic Lázně Bohdaneč players
FK Mladá Boleslav players
Association football goalkeepers